is a Japanese manga written and illustrated by Yōko Shōji. It is serialized in Kodansha's Shōjo Friend from 1977 to 1984. The individual chapters were published into 24 tankōbon by Kodansha between February 1978 and June 1985. Seito Shokun! won the second Kodansha Manga Award in 1978 for the shōjo category.

The sequel to the manga, Seito Shokun! Kyōshi-hen was serialized in Kodansha's Be Love between 2004 and 2011. Another spin-off, Seito Shokun! Saishū-shō: Tabidachi, was published between 2011 and 2019 in the same magazine. The manga was adapted into several live action dramas, with two television drama series, from 1980 to 1981 and in 2007. It was also adapted into two live action television specials, broadcast on Fuji TV on February 23, 1986, and June 8, 1987, respectively.

Releases

Manga
Seito Shokun! is a manga written and illustrated by Yōko Shōji. It is serialized in Kodansha's Shōjo Friend from 1977 to 1984. Kodansha released the manga's 24 tankōbon between February 1978 and June 1985. In September, 1983, Kodansha released a one-shot spin-off of Seito Shokun!, called . Kodansha re-released the manga in 12 kanzenban volumes, which were released between December 12, 1995, and March 12, 1996.

Kodansha released a sequel of the manga, called . It was serialized in Kodansha's josei manga magazine, Be Love. Its first tankōbon volume was published on April 13, 2004, and its last was published on August 11, 2011.

Another spin-off, is published since the August issue of Be Love. Its first tankōbon was published on August 11, 2011, and the latest—the 26th—was released on March 13, 2018.

Live action dramas
The manga was adapted into a 28-episode live action series, which was broadcast on TV Asahi between September 1, 1980, and March 30, 1981. Produced by Toei, the drama was directed by Kimio Hirayama and Takahashi Masaharu, with the script written by Masaki Tsuji and Ryō Nakahara and Takeyuki Suzuki and Yoshiaki Koizumi as producers.

A live action television special, produced by Production Reed, was broadcast on Fuji TV on February 23, 1986. Directed by Mitsuo Kusakabe, it starred Tomoyo Harada, Sumi Shimamoto and Michie Tomizawa.

Another live-action television special, produced by Hori Productions, was broadcast on Fuji TV on June 8, 1987. It was directed by Makoto Naito, produced by Masayuki Morikawa, Nobuyuki Kurauchi and Akifumi Takuma, with the script written by Ryo Ishikawa. The ending theme song, composed by Tsugutoshi Gotō with lyrics written by Yasushi Akimoto, was performed by Ushirogami Hikaretai. It starred Miki Itō, Shigeyuki Nakamura and Nagare Harigawa.

In 2007, Horipro produced a 10-episode live-action television series. Directed by Karaki Marehiro and Tamura Naoki, the drama's 10 episodes was broadcast on TV Asahi between April 20, 2007, and June 22, 2007. The series' ending theme, "My Generation" was performed by Yui, who released a CD containing the theme song on June 13, 2007. The soundtrack for the series was released by Nippon Columbia as a soundtrack CD on June 20, 2007. The DVD box set for the series was released by Asahi Broadcasting Corporation on September 26, 2007. It starred Rina Uchiyama, Kippei Shiina, Maki Horikita and Kanata Hongō.

Reception
Seito Shokun! won the second Kodansha Manga Award in 1978 for the shōjo category.

The fourteenth volume of Seito Shokun! Kyoshi-hen was ranked 10th on the Tohan charts between March 11 and 17, 2008. The sixteenth volume of Seito Shokun! Kyoshi-hen was ranked 10th on the Tohan charts between November 11 and 17, 2008. The seventeenth volume of Seito Shokun! Kyoshi-hen was ranked 26th on the Tohan charts between February 10 and 16, 2009. As of 2010, Seito Shokun! and Seito Shokun! Kyoshi-hen have sold over 25 million copies in Japan.

References

External links

 
 Official Kodansha Seito Shokun! website 

Kodansha manga
Romantic comedy anime and manga
Shōjo manga
Winner of Kodansha Manga Award (Shōjo)